Acacia megalantha is a shrub belonging to the genus Acacia and the subgenus Juliflorae that is endemic to northern Australia.

Description
It has light grey bark and flattened branches towards the apices. The coriaceous and rigid phyllodes have a narrowly elliptic shape and are often oblique. It flowers in April producing yellow flowers. After flowering pale and thick woody seed pods that are flat and straight-sided.

Taxonomy
The species was first formally described by the botanist Ferdinand von Mueller in 1859 as part of the work Contributiones ad Acaciarum Australiae Cognitionem published in the Journal of the Proceedings of the Linnean Society, Botany. It was later reclassified as Racosperma megalanthum in 1987 by Leslie Pedley and transferred back to the genus Acacia in 2001.

Distribution
It is native to central Queensland around Mount Isa, through Arnhem Land in the Northern Territory and the Kimberley region of Western Australia and grows in sandy soils on sandstone, around boulders and on rocky slopes.

See also
 List of Acacia species

References

megalantha
Acacias of Western Australia
Flora of the Northern Territory
Flora of Queensland
Plants described in 1859
Taxa named by Ferdinand von Mueller